Venusia megaspilata is a moth in the family Geometridae first described by William Warren in 1895. It is found in Japan and Korea.

The wingspan is about 17 mm.

References

Moths described in 1895
Venusia (moth)
Moths of Japan